Deaeration is the removal of air molecules (usually meaning oxygen) from another gas or liquid. It can refer to:
Use of a deaerator.
Degasification, the removal of dissolved gases, such as oxygen, from liquids.